Chkhetiani is a Georgian surname. Notable people with the surname include:

Kakhaber Chkhetiani (born 1978), Georgian footballer and manager
Gaga Chkhetiani (born 1983), Georgian footballer

Georgian-language surnames